Svetlana Anatolevna Verteletskaya ( Kormilitsyna, ; born 11 August 1984 in Kaluga) is a Russian fencer in sabers, twice world and European champion,  Honored Master of Sports  of  Russia.

She has higher pedagogical education, graduated from Kaluga State University. Not married, there is a daughter Ksenia. In her spare time she writes poetry.

References

External links
 
  (archive)
 
 

1984 births
Living people
Sportspeople from Kaluga
Russian female foil fencers
21st-century Russian women